Tolga Kashif (Tolga Kaşif) (born 1962) is a British born musical conductor, composer, orchestrator, producer and arranger of Turkish Cypriot descent.

Early life
Turkish-Cypriot Tolga Kashif was born in London. Before going on to further education, Kashif went to Forest School. His compositional and conducting studies at the Royal College of Music led him subsequently to Bristol University with Derek Bourgeois. He had his professional début with the London Royal Philharmonic Orchestra, resulting in further collaborations with the City of London Sinfonia, Royal Liverpool Philharmonic, Northern Sinfonia and the Wren Orchestra. He has been the Music Director of the London Amadeus Choir, which is thought to have influenced the choral elements of Queen Symphony. In 1992 he became the Associate Conductor of the National Symphony Orchestra, with whom he has enjoyed many successful orchestral concerts, particularly at the Barbican Arts Centre (formerly Barbican Hall).

Kashif's work overseas has also been highly reputable. He has conducted the Polish National Symphony and the St Petersburg Philharmonic Orchestra. In 1989, he worked with the London Royal Philharmonic Orchestra abroad in a series of successful concerts held as part of the Istanbul International Festival of the same year. In 1991 he was assigned the position of Permanent Guest Conductor of the Presidential Symphony Orchestra.

The Music Sculptors
As of 1989, Kashif's role as a creative partner in "The Music Sculptors" – one of the principal companies specialising in sound-to-picture – saw him combining his roles as composer, conductor and producer. He worked with some more highly regarded ensembles, including the BBC Symphony, BBC Scottish Symphony and the English Chamber Orchestra. Through this programme, he co-wrote the soundtrack for Silver Fox Films' children's animation First Snow of Winter (1999), which won a British Academy of Film and Television Arts Award, a Royal Television Award and a Prix Jeunesse. Following the film's success, Kashif co-wrote the music to The Second Star to the Left (2001). He also co-wrote the soundtrack for Where the Heart Is, Q.E.D. (BBC TV series) and the BBC's documentary series concerning the Gulf War: Fighting the War. Kashif musically directed the BBC Children in Need's platinum-selling single, "Perfect Day" (1997). Not only did it win many accolades and media awards, but it grossed £2,125,000 for Children in Need.

From 2000 to the present, he has worked with music engineer Steven Price on various advertising campaigns for Blockbuster, Vodafone, Nokia, Marmite and Zurich Insurance, to name a few.

Musical Collaborations
Kashif co-wrote the original score for the feature film, The Criminal (2000), with Mark Sayer-Wade, his partner at The Music Sculptors. He conducted the world premiere of his composition, The Garden of the Prophet (2000) with the English Chamber Orchestra at the Barbican Arts Centre. In 2004 he both produced and arranged Choreography for Sony Classical Records and Maksim Mrvica's Variations Part I&II for EMI. In the same year, he conducted the ECO in Roland Chadwick's The Revealing. Kashif worked with the London Metropolitan Orchestra when recording 3 tracks for Amy Nuttall in her crossover album for EMI Classics: Best Days (2005). He used 33 strings, flutes, oboes, horns, trumpets and trombones for the songs, and they were recorded by engineer Geoff Foster at AIR Lyndhurst Hall.

Kashif has worked closely with Lesley Garrett. In an interview, she claimed they go back a long way and that he has a real understanding of her sound. For her cassette, The Singer (2002), he was the conductor. He then orchestrated all of the songs in her album, When I Fall in Love (2007). This ballad collection reached no 11 in the UK Album Chart.

Kashif was also invited by the famous Korean Rock Icon, Seo Taiji, to collaborate and combine Seo Taiji's past music and extraordinary hits, with Kashif's noteworthy orchestral composition and respected talent. The two presented their works at "The Great Seo Taiji Symphony" Concert held in Seoul, South Korea at the Seoul World Cup Stadium on 27 September 2008. Many Korean critics expected this collaboration to be "one of the most interesting projects done in Korea, yet". In fact, the concert was so successful that it was repeated in December 2008.

National Foundation for Youth Music
In March 2002, Kashif received a commission from the NFYM to write a song for youth: Drop In the Ocean, with additional lyrics by Richard Stilgoe. The composer went on record explaining his inspiration behind the music.

"The well known phrase 'a drop in the ocean' to me represents a universal choice for humanity; either to view ourselves as separate and insignificant or each of us as a unique part of the whole, the 'ocean' of consciousness. I think it is important for children to understand that however small we may feel at times, we all have a crucial part to play both now and in the future. May we never lose the child in us."

The song was recorded by the New London Children's Choir at Abbey Road Studios. It was premiered at the Royal Festival Hall, and was so successful that it received a further performance at the Commonwealth Day Observance at Westminster Abbey in the presence of Her Majesty Elizabeth II of the United Kingdom. Its subsequent CD and Education Pack was mailed to every school in the country.

Future Talent
Along with his good friend Lesley Garrett, Kashif is a patron of the registered charity, Future Talent. This organisation strives for the high prioritisation of music in Primary schools across the UK – they "nurture the musical talent of the future". On their website, Kashif explains why he is a proud sponsor.

"As a child I was fortunate enough to benefit from encouragement and teaching from a wide range of sources. Through music I have had the privilege to experience remarkable moments and have seen its capacity not only to please and harmonise, but also to heal. I have great pleasure in serving Future Talent".

Queen Symphony

History
Kashif spent two years composing the Queen Symphony. He conducted the Royal Philharmonic Orchestra in its debut on Wednesday 6 November 2002. It was performed in the Royal Festival Hall and broadcast on ABC TV to a wide European audience. That night, it received a standing ovation from over two thousand people. This concert was attended by Jer Bulsara (Freddie Mercury's mother), drummer Roger Taylor and guitarist Brian May. They "very much enjoyed it" and they said it was "very moving indeed". After being recorded at Abbey Road Studios in 2002, Queen Symphony was nominated Album of the Year in the 2003 Classical Brit Awards. 
In 2003, Kashif directed the Northern Sinfonia in UK tours with Lesley Garrett. He conducted the Turkish première of Queen Symphony at the International Izmir Festival. He also directed the piece in Australia in two sold-out performances at the Sydney Opera House with the Sydney Symphony Orchestra. These were broadcast on ABC Classic FM. He also conducted a UK tour in 2007.

Work
In 1974, Freddie Mercury said that he would "like people to put their own interpretation" on his own songs, and Kashif did just that. It is a work comprising six movements. It is based on around a dozen well-known melodies from the rock band Queen. These include "Bohemian Rhapsody", "We Will Rock You", "We Are the Champions" and "Who Wants to Live Forever", the latter including a performance by Nicola Loud. Some critics have compared the overall effect with the work of John Williams, notably his Star Wars score. Others have considered the choral elements of the Queen Symphony to be a nod to the rock band's own lavish tendencies, in addition to Kashif's spell as musical director of the London Amadeus Choir. The piece has been performed regularly and in 2004 received US and Dutch premières. The tonal language of the symphony is diverse and draws on much of the Western classical tradition, with Kashif himself listing influences as diverse as medieval music, Romantic music and opera. There are concertante passages for piano in the second movement, and for violin and cello in the third.

Movements
 Adagio misterioso - Allegro con brio - Maestoso - Misterioso - Allegro (Radio Gaga, The Show Must Go On, One Vision, I Was Born To Love You)
 Allegretto - Allegro scherzando - Tranquillo (Love Of My Life, Another One Bites The Dust, Killer Queen)
 Adagio (Who Wants To Live Forever, Save Me)
 Allegro vivo - Moderato cantabile - Cadenza - A tempo primo (Bicycle Race, Save Me)
 Andante doloroso - Allegretto - Alla marcia - Moderato risoluto - Pastorale - Maestoso (Bohemian Rhapsody, We Will Rock You, We Are The Champions, Who Wants To Live Forever)
 Andante sostenuto (We Are The Champions, Bohemian Rhapsody, Who Wants To Live Forever)

The Genesis Suite
On 11 October 2010, at the Barbican in London, Tolga Kashif conducted the London Symphony Orchestra in the world premiere of his new composition, The Genesis Suite, based on the music of the progressive rock band Genesis. The suite was recorded that same year at Abbey Road Studios.

It is composed of seven movements, based on different songs from the band. The first movement is a "filmic" adaptation of the two songs "Land of Confusion" and "Tonight, Tonight, Tonight". The second is based on "Ripples", which is for Piano and Orchestra. The third movement is a Concertante Fantasy for Violin and Orchestra, based on the song "Mad Man Moon", and is the longest piece in the suite (at 16 minutes 40 seconds long). The fourth movement is a comparatively shorter adaptation of "Follow You Follow Me". The fifth movement is based on "Fading Lights". The penultimate movement is a solo piano adaptation of "Entangled". The final movement, echoing the character of the opening movement, is a "filmic" adaptation of the two songs "Undertow" and "Blood on the Rooftops".

Soundtracks
 Q.E.D.;
 Where the Heart Is;
 The First Snow of Winter (Silver Fox Films, 1999);
 The Second Star to the Left (Silver Fox Films, 2001);
 Fighting the War (BBC 2, 2003)

Musical scores
The Criminal (Paramount Home Entertainment UK, 2000)

Discography
 R. Strauss – Don Juan, Tod und Verklärung; Horn Concerto no 1 (conductor, artist: Frank Lloyd, ASV Records, 1997);
 The Singer (conductor, artist: Lesley Garrett, EMI Classics, 2002);
 Queen Symphony (conductor and composer, performed by London Voices, London Oratory School Choir, Royal Philharmonic Orchestra, EMI Classics, 2002);
 The Revealing (conductor, artist and composer: Roland Chadwick, performed by English Chamber Orchestra, New Classical, 2004);
 Choreography (producer and arranger, artist: Vanessa-Mae, Sony Classical Records, 2004);
 Variations (producer and arranger, artist: Maksim Mrvica, EMI, 2004);
 Best Days (conductor, artist: Amy Nuttall, performed by London Metropolitan Orchestra, EMI Classics, 2005)
 The Great 2008 Seotaiji Symphony with Tolga Kashif and Royal Philharmonic (Music Director, Conductor, Arranged[for live], artist: Seotaiji, Natalia Lomeiko, Royal Philharmonic Orchestra, Seotaiji Company, 2009);
 The Genesis Suite – Tolga Kashif & London Symphony Orchestra, 2010 LMG1

Awards
Classical Brit Awards Album of the Year nomination for Queen Symphony, 2003

References

External links

 www.musicpartnership.co.uk
 bbc.co.uk
 Biography of Tolga Kashif
 Steven Price CV
 Biography of Tolga Kashif
 Queen Fan Club in Germany
 Interview with Tolga Kashif about Queen Symphony
 Interview with Lesley Garrett
 PDF Biography of Tolga Kashif
 Future Talent Homepage
 London Metropolitan Orchestra Homepage
 Silver Fox Films Homepage
 Youth Music Homepage
 Queen Symphony Torhout (BE) Homepage

1962 births
Living people
Alumni of the Royal College of Music
People educated at Forest School, Walthamstow
British people of Turkish Cypriot descent
British conductors (music)
British composers
British record producers
British music arrangers
British film score composers
Turkish Cypriot musicians
Musicians from London